Copelatus predaveterus is a species of diving beetle. It is part of the genus Copelatus in the subfamily Copelatinae of the family Dytiscidae. It was described by K. B. Miller in 2003.

References

predaveterus
Beetles described in 2003